Paloh is a mukim in Kluang District, Johor, Malaysia.

History
During the Malayan Emergency (1948–1960) the town was considered a "black area" of communist terrorists and sympathizers.

Geography
The mukim spans over an area of 429 km2.

Demographics
There are 9083 males and 7337 females living in Paloh (16,420 total). There are about 5824 houses.

Economy
The town's main activity is the cultivation of oil palms and rubber trees.

Education
 SMK Paloh
 SMK Seri Kota Paloh 
 SK Bandar Paloh
 SK Paloh 2
 SK Bukit Paloh
 SJK(C)Yu Ming
 SJK(C)Paloh
 SJK(C)Pei Chih, Bukit Paloh
 SJK(C)Sentral Paloh
 SK Kampong Chamek, Paloh
 Sekolah Agama Bandar Paloh
 Sekolah Agama Bandar Paloh 2
 Sekolah Agama Bukit Paloh
 SJK(T)Jalan Stesen Paloh
 Madrasatul Islamiya  Jalan Station Paloh

Housing estates
 Taman Sri Kota Paloh
 Taman Wijaya
 Taman Paloh
 Taman Melati
 Taman Murni
 Kampung Muhibbah
 Kampung India
 Taman Kiara
 Taman Seri Palma
 Kampung Merdeka
 Taman Indah

Transportation
A KTM Intercity railway station is located in this town, and it is linked to Kuala Lumpur and Johor Bahru via the North South Line.

References

External links
 Profile of Paloh
 http://www.paloh.my

Mukims of Kluang District